Bhoje is a village in the Jalgaon District, Maharashtra, India. According to the 2011 census of India, the village had a population of 2,417 people (1,238 males; 1,179 females).

References 

Villages in Jalgaon district